The 2017 Western Athletic Conference baseball tournament was a postseason baseball tournament for the Western Athletic Conference for the 2017–18 season. It began on May 24 and ended on May 27. The top six regular season finishers of the league's ten teams met in the double-elimination tournament held at Hohokam Stadium, spring training home of the Oakland Athletics in Mesa, Arizona. The winner earned the Western Athletic Conference's automatic bid to the 2017 NCAA Division I baseball tournament.

Seeding and format
The top six finishers from the regular season will be seeded based on conference winning percentage. Grand Canyon is ineligible for the tournament due to their transition from Division II.

Bracket

References

Tournament
Western Athletic Conference Baseball Tournament